Jilinibacillus  is a Gram-positive, aerobic, rod-shaped, endospore-forming and motile genus of bacteria from the family of Bacillaceae with one known species (Jilinibacillus soli). Jilinibacillus soli has been isolated from saline and alkali soil from Baicheng City.

References

Bacillaceae
Bacteria genera
Monotypic bacteria genera
Bacteria described in 2015